Henri Auguste Ménégaux (17 May 1857 – 15 July 1937) was a French ornithologist and malacologist born in Audincourt.  He was based at the Muséum national d'histoire naturelle in Paris.  From 1910, with Louis Denise (1863-1914), he was publisher of the journal, Revue Française d'Ornithologie Scientifique et Pratique.

In 1899 he supported his graduate thesis at the Sorbonne with a dissertation on marine bivalves titled Recherches sur la circulation des Lamellibranches marins. In 1901 he replaced Eugène de Pousargues (1859-1901) as assistant to Émile Oustalet (1844-1905) at the Muséum national d'histoire naturelle (mammals and birds). Later he became deputy director of the laboratory headed by Édouard Louis Trouessart (1842-1927).

His studies included birds collected by the French Antarctic Expedition commanded by Jean-Baptiste Charcot (1867-1936). In 1912 he became a founder of the Ligue pour la Protection des Oiseaux (League for the Protection of Birds).

Written works 
 Les oiseaux de France (Birds of France); four volumes
 Etude des especes critiques et des types du groupe des Passereaux tracheophones de l'Amerique tropicale appartenant aux collections du Museum, 1906
 Voyage de M. Guy Babault dans l'Afrique orientale anglaise et dans l'Ouganda : etude d'une collection d'oiseaux de l'Afrique orientale anglaise et de l'Ouganda, 1923.

References
 
 Biographical information based on an equivalent article at the French Wikipedia, namely: Philippe Jaussaud & Edward R. Brygoo (2004). From the Garden at the Museum in 516 biographies . National Museum of Natural History in Paris, 630 p.

1857 births
1937 deaths
French ornithologists
French malacologists
People from Doubs
National Museum of Natural History (France) people